Ričardas Berankis was the defending champion, but chose to play in the Atlanta Open instead.

Mikhail Kukushkin won the tournament, defeating Evgeny Donskoy in the final.

Seeds

Draw

Finals

Top half

Bottom half

References

External links
 Main draw
 Qualifying draw

President's Cup (tennis) - Men's Singles
2015 Men's Singles